Daniel Isn't Real is a 2019 American psychological horror film directed by Adam Egypt Mortimer, from a screenplay by Mortimer and Brian DeLeeuw, based upon the novel In This Way I Was Saved by DeLeeuw. It stars Miles Robbins, Patrick Schwarzenegger, Sasha Lane, Mary Stuart Masterson, Hannah Marks, Chukwudi Iwuji and Peter McRobbie.

Daniel Isn't Real had its world premiere at South by Southwest on March 9, 2019. It was released on December 6, 2019, by Samuel Goldwyn Films in select theaters and digitally.

Plot
As a child, shy and troubled Luke witnesses the aftermath of a mass shooting at a neighborhood coffee shop. He meets another boy among the onlookers at the scene: cool and confident Daniel, who invites him to play and quickly becomes his friend. Although adults such as Luke's mother, Claire (Mary Stuart Masterson), cannot see Daniel, he appears physically real to Luke. The boys become close playmates, and their connection helps Luke cope with his parents' divorce.

Their friendship comes to an abrupt end when Daniel convinces Luke that blending an entire bottle of Claire's psychiatric medication into a smoothie will give her superpowers. Instead, it results in a near-fatal poisoning. Claire convinces Luke to send Daniel away by symbolically locking him in her mother's old dollhouse.

Years later, the college-aged Luke (Miles Robbins) is paralyzed by anxiety over his future, his social life and his responsibility to his mother, who struggles with paranoid delusions and a hatred of her own reflection. He confides to his therapist, Dr. Cornelius Braun (Chukwudi Iwuji), that he is afraid he will eventually become just like her. One night, while sleeping at his childhood home, Luke unlocks the dollhouse.

Daniel (Patrick Schwarzenegger) reappears as an adult. His influence initially appears benign as he helps Luke thwart Claire's suicide attempt, succeed in school, and begin a romance with an artist named Cassie (Sasha Lane). However, he quickly starts exhibiting aggressive behavior, becoming enraged when Luke doesn't obey him. When Luke won't have sex with a psychology student named Sophie (Hannah Marks) on a date, Daniel forcibly takes over his body, has rough sex with Sophie and attacks Luke's roommate. Luke is banned from campus as a result and begins to question his own sanity, believing he may have schizophrenia. He attempts to banish Daniel back to the dollhouse but is unsuccessful.

Luke becomes increasingly unstable, convinced that Daniel is taking over his body while he sleeps. He visits the father of John Thigpen, the shooter whose crime began the film, and learns John also had an invisible friend named Daniel. Luke begins to realize Daniel is a supernatural entity, not an imaginary friend.

Dr. Braun makes a late-night house call in an attempt to separate Luke and Daniel, but only succeeds in allowing Daniel to take over Luke's body and banish Luke's consciousness to the dollhouse. Daniel then kills Braun. He decides his next target will be Cassie.

Daniel reveals his true nature to Cassie, describing himself as "a traveler," before chasing her to the rooftop of her apartment building. Cassie begs Luke to come back to reality; hearing her from inside the dollhouse, he summons the will to escape.

In a final confrontation with Luke, Daniel claims he has helped people for centuries, but none of them have deserved his help. Luke calls him a parasite.

Luke realizes he and Daniel can never truly be separated. After ensuring Cassie has escaped to safety, he kills himself by jumping from the roof. Cassie lies down beside his body.

Daniel, surrounded by an otherworldly darkness, reverts to his true monstrous form, implying he will now seek out a new host.

Cast
 Miles Robbins as Luke Nightingale
Griffin Robert Faulkner as Young Luke Nightingale
 Patrick Schwarzenegger as Daniel
Nathan Reid as Young Daniel
 Sasha Lane as Cassie
 Hannah Marks as Sophie
 Mary Stuart Masterson as Claire Nightingale
 Chukwudi Iwuji as Dr. Cornelius Braun
 Peter McRobbie as Percy Thigpen
 Michael Cuomo as James
 Andrew Bridges as Richard
 Katie Chang as Barista
 Chase Sui Wonders as Makayla

Production
In July 2018, it was announced Miles Robbins, Patrick Schwarzenegger, Sasha Lane, and Hannah Marks joined the cast of the film, with Adam Egypt Mortimer directing from a screenplay he co-wrote with Brian DeLeeuw, based upon a novel by DeLeeuw. Elijah Wood, Daniel Noah, Josh C. Waller and Lisa Whalen will produce the film, while Timur Bekbosunov, Johnny Chang, Emma Lee, Peter Wong and Stacy Jorgensen will serve as executive producers, under their SpectreVision and ACE Pictures banners, respectively.

Filming
Principal photography began in July 2018, in New York City.

Release
It had its world premiere at South by Southwest on March 9, 2019. Shortly after, Samuel Goldwyn Films acquired distribution rights to the film. It was released on December 6, 2019.

Critical response
The critical consensus reads "Daniel Isn't Real, but the smart, stylish fun waiting for genre lovers in this well-acted suspense thriller is completely genuine." On Metacritic, the film holds an averaged score of 61 out of 100 based on 11 critic reviews, indicating "generally favorable reviews".

For Variety, Dennis Harvey called the film "first-rate in all departments" and a "stylishly crafted psychological horror thriller". Katie Rife of The A.V. Club wrote that the film is "a slick and thrilling take on the intersection of mental illness and creative inspiration that also doubles as a commentary on toxic masculinity" and awarded the film a B. The Hollywood Reporter's Frank Scheck said "The film is most effective when keeping the viewer off-balance as to whether the title character is merely a figment of Luke's possible mental illness or an actual malevolent force of the demonic variety who seeks more and more control of Luke's behavior".

Sequels
In December 2020, while speaking to Bloody Disgusting, Mortimer confirmed a "Vortex Trilogy" consisting of Daniel Isn't Real, Archenemy, and a planned third film, saying "mark my words we are going to make a third movie in the Vortex Trilogy that will have Daniel return and force Max, in some form, to deal with it. A crisis on infinite vortices pulling together as many of the characters from both stories as we can fit for a true cosmic horror/cosmic action crossover hybrid!"

References

External links

2019 horror thriller films
American horror thriller films
Films based on American novels
American independent films
Films shot in New York City
Samuel Goldwyn Films films
2010s English-language films
Films directed by Adam Egypt Mortimer
2010s American films
2019 independent films